Erotic Poetry, released in 1991, is the first extended play (EP) album by Esham A. Smith. It followed his 1989 LP album Boomin' Words from Hell, as his second release overall. Much like Boomin' Words from Hell, an earlier version was released including alternative artwork and instrumentals, however it was released in limited numbers and is considered a collector's item by Esham fans.

Track listing

References

1991 EPs
Albums produced by Esham
Albums produced by Mike E. Clark
Esham EPs
Reel Life Productions EPs